Klaas Heufer-Umlauf (born 22 September 1983 in Oldenburg) is a German television host, producer, actor and singer. He is best known as part of the duo Joko & Klaas, alongside Joko Winterscheidt.

Biography 
Heufer-Umlauf is a trained hairdresser. After he won a casting, he started his career as a TV host in VIVA Live!, Retro Charts, and Klaas' Wochenshow. He appeared in the sitcom Alle lieben Jimmy on RTL and the music video "And No Matches" by Scooter. From June 2009 to March 2011, Heufer-Umlauf co-hosted the late-night talk show MTV Home with Joko Winterscheidt on MTV Germany. From October 2011 to January 2013, they co-hosted NeoParadise on ZDFneo, which is considered a successor of MTV Home.

Since 2011, Joko and Klaas are hosting several shows on ProSieben, including the game shows 17 Meter, Die Rechnung geht auf uns, and Joko gegen Klaas - Das Duell um die Welt. In February 2013, they started the show Circus HalliGalli (2013–2017) on ProSieben, a successor of MTV Home and neoParadise. Later that year, Heufer-Umlauf starred in the film , along with Jacob Matschenz and Kostja Ullmann.

Heufer-Umlauf is the founder and singer of the band Gloria. In September 2013, the band's first album was released.

Since 2012, Heufer-Umlauf has been dating Austrian TV host Doris Golpashin. Their first child was born on 14 April 2013, and second child was born in 2018.

Works

Filmography

Films 
 2006: Altwarp-Neuwarp (short film)
 2006: Im Leben eine Eins
 2007: Familienschaukel (short film)
 2008: Die Folgen der Schwangerschaft einer Kampfrichterin (short film)
 2008: Für immer ist das Edelweiß
 2010: Come Back Home (short film)
 2010: Riss (short film)
 2011: 
 2013: 
 2013: Battle of the Year
 2014: Dear Courtney
 2014: Coming In
 2014: Freiland
 2015: Look Who's Back (Cameo)
 2015: Meier Müller Schmidt
 2017: Jürgen – Heute wird gelebt
 2019: Die Goldfische

TV Series 
 2018: Jennifer – Sehnsucht nach was Besseres
 2019: Check Check
 2023: The Swarm

TV Shows 

 2005: 17 (VIVA)
 2005–2009: VIVA Live! (VIVA)
 2006–2009: Klaas' Wochenshow (VIVA)
 2008: Show der Woche mit Oliver Geissen (RTL)
 2008: Retro Charts (VIVA)
 2009: Mascerade – Deutschland verbiegt sich (ProSieben)
 2009: Superspots – die besten Clips im Umlauf (ProSieben)
 2009–2011: MTV Home (MTV)
 2010: Beck's Most Wanted Music (MTV)
 2010–2012: Ahnungslos (ProSieben)
 2010: Pringles Xtreme.tv
 2011–2012: 17 Meter (ProSieben)
 2011: TVLab (ZDFneo)
 2011–2013: neoParadise (ZDFneo)
 2011: Joko & Klaas – Die Rechnung geht auf uns (ProSieben)
 since 2012: Joko gegen Klaas – Das Duell um die Welt (ProSieben)
 2013–2017: Circus HalliGalli (ProSieben)
 2014–2016: Mein bester Feind (ProSieben)
 since 2015: Teamwork – Spiel mit deinem Star (ProSieben)
 2016–2017: Das Duell um die Geld (ProSieben)
 since 2016: Die beste Show der Welt (ProSieben)
 2016: My Idiot Friend (ProSieben)
 since 2018: Late Night Berlin (ProSieben)
 since 2018: Weihnachten mit Joko und Klaas (ProSieben)
 since 2019: Joko & Klaas gegen ProSieben (ProSieben)
 2019: Taff (ProSieben)

Documentaries 
 2011: Finding Brave (ProSieben)

Radio 
 2007–2009: Klaas' Kosmos (Bremen Vier)
 2011: Zwei alte Hasen erzählen von Früher (Radio Eins)

Discography

Singles 
 2014: U-Bahn-Ficker (with Eko Fresh and Joko Winterscheidt)
 2018: Smart Home H**rensohn (with 101 ASSIstentenbande)
 2018: Klaas Fußballsong (Ich schau Fußball an) (with Gloria)
 2019: Clans for Future (feat. Clan Allstars)
 2019: Die Gang ist mein Team  (with Capital Bra)
 2019: We Love to Entertain You (with Joko Winterscheidt)
Additional singles with Gloria

Awards 
1Live Krone
 2014: Sonderpreis (with Joko Winterscheidt)

Deutscher Comedypreis
 2013: Beste Comedyshow for Circus HalliGalli (with Joko Winterscheidt)

Deutscher Fernsehpreis
 2012: Besondere Leistung Unterhaltung (with Joko Winterscheidt)
 2014: Bester Show-Moderator (Publikumspreis, with Joko Winterscheidt)
 2016: Beste Unterhaltung Primetime for Joko gegen Klaas – Das Duell um die Welt (with Joko Winterscheidt)
 2017: Beste Unterhaltung Primetime for Die beste Show der Welt (with Joko Winterscheidt)

Echo (Musikpreis)
 2014: Partner des Jahres for Circus HalliGalli (with Joko Winterscheidt)

Gentlemen’s Quarterly (GQ-Awards)
 2012: Fernsehen

Grimme Online Award
 2008: Initiator & Autor stoerungsmelder.org

Grimme-Preis
 2014: Unterhaltung for Circus HalliGalli (with Joko Winterscheidt)
 2018: Unterhaltung for #Gosling-Gate (with Circus HalliGalli)
 2020: Unterhaltung for Joko & Klaas LIVE – 15 Minuten (Season 1, with Thomas Martiens, Thomas Schmitt and Joko Winterscheidt)

NCB Hörerpreis (Newcomer Contest Bayern)
 2014

Radio Regenbogen Award
 2017: Medienmänner 2016 (with Joko Winterscheidt)

Rose d’Or
 2014: Entertainment für Circus HalliGalli (with Joko Winterscheidt)

External links

References 

1983 births
Living people
German television talk show hosts
German game show hosts
German television personalities
People from Oldenburg (city)
ProSieben people